These are the official results of the Women's heptathlon competition at the 1994 European Championships in Helsinki, Finland. The competition was held at Helsinki Olympic Stadium on 8 August and 9 August 1994.

Medalists

Results

Final
8/9 August

Participation
According to an unofficial count, 25 athletes from 13 countries participated in the event.

 (2)
 (3)
 (3)
 (3)
 (1)
 (2)
 (1)
 (1)
 (1)
 (2)
 (3)
 (1)
 (2)

See also
 1990 Women's European Championships Heptathlon (Split)
 1991 Women's World Championships Heptathlon (Tokyo)
 1992 Women's Olympic Heptathlon (Barcelona)
 1993 Women's World Championships Heptathlon (Stuttgart)
 1994 Hypo-Meeting
 1995 Women's World Championships Heptathlon (Gothenburg)
 1996 Women's Olympic Heptathlon (Atlanta)
 1998 Women's European Championships Heptathlon (Budapest)

References

 Results

Heptathlon
Combined events at the European Athletics Championships
1994 in women's athletics